Somatochlora dido is a species of dragonfly in the family Corduliidae. It is known from southeastern China and northern Vietnam, but populations in Vietnam may alternatively represent a separate, undescribed, species. S. dido has sometimes been treated as synonymous with S. taiwana from Taiwan, but more recent publications have treated them as separate species. S. shennong is also closely related.

Somatochlora dido was first described by James George Needham in 1930, in A Manual of the Dragonflies of China.

References

Corduliidae
Odonata of Asia
Insects of China
Insects of Vietnam
Insects described in 1930
Taxa named by James George Needham